Original Artist Hit List is a live album released by the funk/R&B group Cameo in 2003. In addition to the live material, two studio tracks were included: "Come Fly With Me", and "Nasty", both written by Larry Blackmon.  The "Mega-Mix" is a remix of the album's live tracks. This album is a track for track re-release of Nasty from 1996. The album was simply retitled and given new cover art.

Track listing
 "Intro" – 1:03
 "Flirt" – 1:36 – Blackmon, Jenkins
 "She's Strange" – 2:37 – Blackmon, Jenkins, Leftenant, Singleton
 "Back and Forth" – 5:54 – Blackmon, Jenkins, Kendrick, Leftenant
 "Skin I'm In" – 5:09 – Blackmon  	  
 "Why Have I Lost You" – 6:10 – Blackmon  	  
 "Sparkle" – 4:23 – Blackmon, Lockett
 "Candy" – 4:45 – Blackmon, Jenkins
 "Shake Your Pants" (Intro) – 0:42
 "Shake Your Pants" – 4:00 – Blackmon
 "I Just Want to Be" – 1:38 – Blackmon, Johnson
 "Keep It Hot" – 5:12 – Blackmon, Lockett
 "Word Up!" – 6:44 – Blackmon, Jenkins
 "Come Fly With Me" – 3:57 – Blackmon
 "Nasty" – 3:44 – Blackmon
 "Mega-Mix" – 6:27 – Cameo

Original Artist Hit List
Original Artist Hit List